Deng Yanda (1 March 1895 – 29 November 1931) was a military officer in the Chinese Nationalist Party. He broke with party leaders in 1927, denouncing them as traitors to the party's original principles and in 1930 attempted to form a new party, which he called the Provisional Action Committee of the Chinese Nationalist Party or Third Party. It was later renamed the Chinese Peasants' and Workers' Democratic Party. In 1931 he was convicted of treason by the Nationalist government and secretly executed. Today, Deng is recognized as a revolutionary martyr by the People's Republic of China.

Life
Deng Yanda was born in Huizhou County, Guangdong province. He was educated in military schools in Guangdong and Wuhan, graduating from Baoding Military Academy in 1919. Deng was recruited to the Guangdong Army in 1920 and fought under the Nationalist officer Deng Keng. When Sun Yat-sen announced his policy of alliance with the Soviet Union in 1923, Deng strongly supported it and was appointed to the preparatory committee for the Whampoa Military Academy which the Russians helped the Chinese Nationalists build. He was an important commander in the Northern Expedition (1926–1928) which the Nationalists launched to unify China. When Chiang Kai-shek broke with the Chinese Communist Party and Russia, Deng denounced Chiang and left China for Russia and Europe, where he lived from 1927 to 1930.  On his return to China, Deng formed a new party, which he called the Provisional Action Committee of the Chinese Nationalist Party or Third Party (renamed Chinese Peasants' and Workers' Democratic Party in 1947).

By the mid-1920s, most of the Chinese political parties that were founded during the early years of the Republican era had disappeared from the political circles. There remained only two parties that became the decisive forces to the destiny of the country — the Chinese Communist Party (CCP) and the Kuomintang (KMT) after its reshuffle. In 1927, the cooperation between the CCP and the KMT broke down. Chiang Kai-shek brought a policy of slaughter and armed-suppression to the CCP. To contend against the KMT, the Chinese Communists were forced to shift their bases to the countryside and mountain areas. Since then, the prolonged life-and-death struggle between the two political parties emerged in China. Against the background of this division of Chinese politics into two opposing parties, Deng's party, also known as the Third Party came into being.

Deng vigorously attacked Chiang Kai-shek as a dictator, angering the Nationalist government in Nanjing. He further angered them when he supported an anti-Chiang secessionist movement in Guangzhou in 1931. He was arrested in Shanghai's International Settlement on 17 August 1931, and extradited to Nanjing, where he was executed on 29 November 1931.  His tomb is located near Sun Yat-sen's Mausoleum on Zhongshan Mountain near Nanjing

Political beliefs
Deng's views were socialist but after he left the Nationalists, he did not align with other parties, insisting that China's revolution should not be reined in to fit the needs of Russia or the Comintern.  After Deng's death, his party supported the short-lived Fujian People's Government which opposed Chiang Kai-shek and sought an alliance with the Chinese Communists. The party eventually became one of the eight legal non-Communist parties in the People's Republic of China, where Deng is now recognised as a "Revolutionary Martyr." Although Deng's views are sometimes identified with those of Soong Ching-ling, Sun Yat-sen's widow, Soong did not join Deng's party and refused an offer to become its leader after his death.

Footnotes

References
 Boorman, Howard L. ed. Biographical Dictionary of Republican China. New York: Columbia University Press, 1967–71.
 Epstein, Israel. Woman in History: Life and Times of Soong Ching Ling (Mme. Sun Yatsen). 2nd ed. Beijing: New World Press, 1995.
 Rulers, De-Dh
 Modern China: An Encyclopedia of History, Culture, and Nationalism

1895 births
1931 deaths
People executed for treason against China
People of the Northern Expedition
Executed Republic of China people
People executed by the Republic of China by firearm
Politicians from Huizhou
Hakka politicians
Republic of China politicians from Guangdong
Members of the Kuomintang
Executed Chinese people
Executed people from Guangdong
Chinese Peasants' and Workers' Democratic Party politicians
Martyrs
Burials in Nanjing